Ivana Ivanović (born 19 July 1979) is a Serbian football midfielder, currently playing for SFK Sarajevo in the Bosnian League. She has played the Champions League with Mašinac Niš and Sarajevo.

She has been a member of the Serbian national team.

References

1979 births
Living people
Serbian women's footballers
Serbia women's international footballers
Expatriate women's footballers in Bosnia and Herzegovina
Women's association football midfielders
ŽFK Mašinac PZP Niš players